Smith Building was a historic commercial building located at Parkersburg, Wood County, West Virginia. It was built in 1898, and is a three-story, 18 bay, brick building.  It featured corbeled hanging buttresses at the corners and curved brickwork.  It once housed a bowling alley, but storefronts later occupied the first floor.

It was listed on the National Register of Historic Places in 1982.

References

Buildings and structures in Parkersburg, West Virginia
Commercial buildings on the National Register of Historic Places in West Virginia
Commercial buildings completed in 1898
Demolished buildings and structures in West Virginia
National Register of Historic Places in Wood County, West Virginia
1898 establishments in West Virginia